Crash Gallery is a Canadian television reality series, which was premiered on October 2, 2015, on CBC Television. Hosted by Sean O'Neill, each episode of the series pitted three artists against each other in a creative competition.

The series was not renewed for a third season.

References

External links

2015 Canadian television series debuts
CBC Television original programming
2010s Canadian reality television series
2017 Canadian television series endings